The 2021 Duquesne Dukes football team represented Duquesne University as a member of the Northeast Conference (NEC) in the 2021 NCAA Division I FCS football season. The Dukes, led by 17th-year head coach Jerry Schmitt, played their home games at Arthur J. Rooney Athletic Field.

Schedule

Game Summaries

at TCU

References

Duquesne
Duquesne Dukes football seasons
Duquesne Dukes football